Glåmos is a mountain village in Røros municipality in Trøndelag county, Norway. It is the location of the Glåmos Church and the Glåmos Station which sits along the Rørosbanen railway. The village was the administrative centre of the old municipality of Glåmos which existed from 1926 until 1964. In 2001, the village had about 300 residents.

The village has several old copper mines located nearby that used to supply the Røros Copper Works in the town of Røros.

Name
The first element of the name is the name of the river Glåma and the last element is os meaning the "starting point of a river". The river Glåma is considered to start near here at the end of the lake Aursunden.

References

Røros
Villages in Trøndelag